Serhiy Borzenko (born 22 June 1986 in Komsomolske, Zmiiv Raion, Kharkiv Oblast, Ukrainian SSR) is a professional Ukrainian footballer, who plays as a midfielder for Vovchansk.

He is a product of the FC Arsenal Kharkiv sports school system, and later played for clubs from Kharkiv region and East Ukraine.

References

External links
 
 

1986 births
Living people
Ukrainian footballers
Association football defenders
FC Tytan Armyansk players
FC Arsenal Kharkiv players
FC Poltava players
FC Helios Kharkiv players
FC Kremin Kremenchuk players
FC Olimpik Donetsk players
NK Veres Rivne players
FC Lviv players
FC Vovchansk players
Ukrainian Premier League players
Ukrainian First League players
Ukrainian Second League players
Sportspeople from Kharkiv Oblast